Jean-Baptiste Hamelin (August 9, 1733 – September 23, 1804) was a French Canadian soldier who fought on the U.S. side of the American Revolutionary War, serving in Moses Hazen's 2nd Canadian Regiment of the Continental Army.

Hamelin participated in the battle of the Congress Own Regiment until 1779 where he was sent in the west to help George Rogers Clark in his campaigns.  He was sent by Augustin de La Balme to attack Fort St. Joseph (modern-day Niles, Michigan).  The attack itself was successful, but his party was chased down and some of his men were caught and killed.

References
Jean-Baptiste Hamelin at Chazy after the war
Jean-Baptiste military service

1733 births
1804 deaths
Continental Army officers from Canada
French Canadians in the American Revolution